Senator Barney may refer to:

John A. Barney (1840–1911), Wisconsin State Senate
Obed Barney (fl. 1840s), Massachusetts State Senate

See also
Senator Varney (disambiguation)